Abo or ABO may refer to:

Places
 Abo (historic place), an archaeological site in  New Mexico, United States
 Åbo, the original Swedish name for Turku, a city in Finland
 Abo, Missouri, an unincorporated community
 Abo, New Mexico, an unincorporated community in the United States
 Abo Canyon, also called Abo Pass, a mountain pass in central New Mexico
 Aboh, also known as Abo or Ibo, a town in Nigeria's Delta State

People
 Abo (name), an Arabic or Hebrew male name
 Abo of Tiflis (–786), an Arab East Orthodox Catholic saint
 Abo, an offensive reference to Aboriginal Australians

Languages
 Abõ or Abon, a Cameroonian language (ISO 639-3: abo)
 Bankon language or Abo, a Cameroonian language

Math and science
 ABO blood group system, a human blood type and blood group system
 ABO (gene), a gene in humans which encodes the ABO blood group system transferase enzyme
 Adaptive Binary Optimization, an image compression algorithm

Organizations
 American Board of Ophthalmology, a professional organization for ophthalmologists
 American Board of Opticianry, a professional organization for opticians
 American Board of Orthodontics, a professional organization for orthodontists
 Antikythira Bird Observatory in Greece

Transportation
 Aboisso Airport (IATA: ABO) in Côte d'Ivoire
 Antonio (Nery) Juarbe Pol Airport (FAA: ABO) in Arecibo, Puerto Rico

See also
 Treaty of Åbo
 Abbo (disambiguation)
 Abo Call
 Astro Box Office
 Omegaverse, a genre of fiction also known as A/B/O